Mönkhtöriin Lkhagvagerel (born 4 January 1998) is a Mongolian wrestler. He won the silver medal in the men's 125kg event at the 2022 World Wrestling Championships held in Belgrade, Serbia. He competed in the 2020 Summer Olympics.

In 2022, he won the silver medal in his event at the Yasar Dogu Tournament held in Istanbul, Turkey.

References

External links
 

Living people
1998 births
Mongolian male sport wrestlers
Wrestlers at the 2020 Summer Olympics
Olympic wrestlers of Mongolia
World Wrestling Championships medalists
21st-century Mongolian people